Peter S. Brown (born September 19, 1986), better known his stage name Peter Vack, is an American actor, writer, director and producer. He is best known for portraying Jason Strider in the MTV comedy series I Just Want My Pants Back (2011–2012), and Alex Merriweather in the Amazon Video comedy-drama series Mozart in the Jungle (2014–2015). Vack also voiced antagonist Gary Smith in the Rockstar Games video game Bully.

Early life
Vack was born in the West Village neighborhood of Manhattan in New York City to Jane ( Spivack) and Ronald Brown, a movie producer and writer. He has a younger sister, Betsey, an actress and writer. Vack is Jewish.

Raised in New York City, he attended Riverdale Country School and graduated from Professional Children's School. Vack graduated from the University of Southern California, where he studied Theater.

Career
Vack made his acting debut in the short film Dear Diary (1996), which won the Academy Award for Best Live Action Short Film. Vack has guest-starred in single episodes of Hope & Faith (2004), Third Watch (2004), Law & Order: Special Victims Unit (2005), Ghost Whisperer (2009) and Cold Case (2010).

From 2011 until its cancellation the following year, he portrayed Jason Strider in the short-lived MTV television series I Just Want My Pants Back. He co-starred as Alex Merriweather in the Amazon Video comedy-drama series Mozart in the Jungle (2014–2015), alongside Lola Kirke, Malcolm McDowell and Bernadette Peters.

In 2020, Vack gave an in-depth interview on popular podcast The Ion Pod.

In 2022, Vack shot "www.rachelormont.com" a feature film he wrote and directed; described as a "technosatire about growing up in captivity" starring Betsey Brown, Chloe Cherry, and Dasha Nekrasova.

Filmography

Film

Television

Video games

Awards and nominations

References

External links

1986 births
Living people
Male actors from New York City
American male film actors
American male television actors
American male voice actors
20th-century American male actors
21st-century American male actors
American male video game actors
Jewish American male actors
USC School of Dramatic Arts alumni
People from Greenwich Village
Riverdale Country School alumni
21st-century American Jews